Busan International High School is a prominent high school located in Busan, South Korea specializing in the humanities & social science. BIHS is a co-educational public high school, opened in 1997 for the purpose of preparing students as experts in international relations. Schools for this purpose are called "International High Schools," and BIHS is one of them along with 6 other schools including Cheongshim International High School and Seoul International High School. These schools are classified as "Special Purpose High Schools" (teuksu mokjeok godeung hakgyo 특수목적고등학교). Founded in 1997, BIHS is the first international high school among 7 international high schools in South Korea.

Unlike Foreign Language High Schools, students at Busan International High School are not divided into classes based on what language they major in. Instead, they are distributed randomly into seven classes in each year, and select their second foreign language among Chinese, Japanese, Spanish, and French.

Middle school grades, and interviews along with future scholastic plans are taken into consideration in order to select 160 students per year. The 160 students are then divided into eight classes, which consist of roughly twenty students each. 
The reputation of the school in Busan is relatively high, and the majority of students pursue a secondary degree in prestigious universities located in Seoul. However, many students are also pursuing a degree in foreign universities located in Japan, China, United Kingdom, United States, and Netherlands. The school is also holding a joint program with Waseda University and Tsinghua University, which allows students to enter those universities relatively easily. 
As in 2015,  Busan International high school has ranked 9th place in the Korean SAT scores nationwide among entire Korean high schools. 

Every freshmen in the school has to choose a club to join, in which it will last for the 3 years of their high school years. Notable clubs includes Debating club, Acting club, Orchestra, and Dancing club. 

BIHS is well known for its broad partnership with various schools worldwide, including schools from Japan, China, Taiwan, Russia, France, Kazakhstan, Australia, United States, Vietnam, and Sweden. The school is holding an annual global forum with students from its partner school, allowing its students a chance to connect with the world.

External links
 

Busan
High schools in South Korea
Educational institutions established in 1997
1997 establishments in South Korea